Marianna Missouri Pacific Depot is a historic railroad station at Carolina and Jarrett Streets in Marianna, Arkansas.  It is a long rectangular brick building, with a tile roof.  A projection on the track side for the telegrapher's booth is matched by a projection on the opposite side.  The depot was built in 1915 by the Missouri Pacific Railroad during a major expansion campaign throughout the state, to provide passenger and freight services to the city.

The building was listed on the U.S. National Register of Historic Places in 1994, at which time it housed a job training center.

See also
National Register of Historic Places listings in Lee County, Arkansas

References

Former railway stations in Arkansas
Railway stations on the National Register of Historic Places in Arkansas
Former Missouri Pacific Railroad stations
Italianate architecture in Arkansas
Railway stations in the United States opened in 1915
National Register of Historic Places in Lee County, Arkansas
1915 establishments in Arkansas